Scott Simpson (born 21 July 1979) is a Welsh pole vaulter.

Born in Bath, England, he finished sixth at the 2006 Commonwealth Games.

His personal best jump is 5.41 metres, achieved in 2006. He has 5.42 metres on the indoor track, achieved in March 2007 in Sheffield.

He is the head coach of Welsh Athletics and also the coach of British pole vaulter Holly Bradshaw.

References

1979 births
Living people
Sportspeople from Bath, Somerset
Welsh pole vaulters
Athletes (track and field) at the 2006 Commonwealth Games
British male pole vaulters
Commonwealth Games competitors for Wales